The Cavalry Club was a London gentlemen's club, which was established in 1890. In 1975, it merged with the Guards' Club, and became the Cavalry and Guards Club, which still exists today.

When the Cavalry Club first occupied the site, on Piccadilly in Mayfair, in 1890, it was a proprietary club owned by an officer in the 20th Hussars, but five years later, ownership passed into the hands of its members and it became a members' club. They raised the funds to build an entirely new clubhouse, which was designed by B. N. H. Orphoot of Mewes and Davies and completed on the site in 1908.

Like many London clubs, both the Cavalry Club and the Guards' Club went through a period of serious financial hardship in the 1970s. The solution proposed was a merger. The Guards' Club was due to close anyway, so their premises closed in 1975, and their 800 members joined the renamed Cavalry Club, also bringing numerous objets d'art with them.

References

External links
The website of the Cavalry and Guards Club, the club's successor

See also
List of gentlemen's clubs in London

Gentlemen's clubs in London
1890 establishments in England
Organizations established in 1890
Military gentlemen's clubs